Luigi Glombard (born 21 August 1984) is a French professional footballer who plays as a striker. He was most recently contracted to Les Herbiers.

Club career

Glombard joined the Nantes academy in 2000 and made his senior debut in 2002. He joined Cardiff City in the summer of 2006 but moved on transfer deadline day to Leicester City for an initial one-month loan, subject to Football League paperwork.

He made his Leicester City debut coming on as a sub in the 2nd half against Ipswich Town, but never made another appearance and returned to Cardiff on the 27 February 2007. A loan spell at Oldham Athletic then materialised with Glombard scoring once against Bradford in three starts for the Latics. In May 2007 Glombard was released from Cardiff City and went on to sign for Grenoble Foot 38, spending one year at the club before joining Chamois Niortais in 2008. He scored five goals in his first season in Niort, but left the club after they were relegated to the Championnat de France amateur in 2009. On 5 January 2010, he re-signed for the club and scored on his second debut for the team, netting the second goal in the 2–0 win over Genets Anglet.

International career

Glombard has represented France at under-17 level, competing in the 2001 Under-17 World Championships, playing alongside the likes of Anthony Le Tallec and Florent Sinama Pongolle.

References

External links

Luigi Glombard foot-national.com Profile 

1984 births
Living people
Sportspeople from Montreuil, Seine-Saint-Denis
French footballers
French people of Martiniquais descent
Ligue 1 players
Ligue 2 players
Championnat National players
FC Nantes players
Cardiff City F.C. players
Leicester City F.C. players
Oldham Athletic A.F.C. players
English Football League players
Grenoble Foot 38 players
Chamois Niortais F.C. players
US Orléans players
Les Herbiers VF players
Expatriate footballers in England
France youth international footballers
Association football forwards
Footballers from Seine-Saint-Denis